Noragugume is a comune (municipality) in the Province of Nuoro in the Italian region Sardinia, located about  north of Cagliari and about  west of Nuoro.

Noragugume borders the following municipalities: Bolotana, Dualchi, Ottana, Sedilo, Silanus.

References

Cities and towns in Sardinia